Uplands Park is located within the municipality of Oak Bay, in the Uplands neighborhood, adjacent to the city of Victoria, British Columbia.

From 1860 to 1910, cattle were pushed overboard from paddle steamers to swim ashore to what is now Cattle Point, which is where the name Cattle Point comes from.

It is among North America's first natural preserves to be set aside in an urban region; it was established in the 1940s by the Oak Bay city council, under the leadership of Reeve Walter Walker.  A cairn, marking Walker's instrumental role in the creation of Uplands Park, stands at Cattle Point, near the southern coastal edge of the park.

Cattle Point was designated an Urban Star Park in 2013 by the Royal Astronomical Society of Canada, only the second such park in the country. It joins a national and global network of Dark-sky preserves mostly found in remote areas and wilderness which adhere to guidelines to conserve the night sky for astronomical observation.

External links
The District of Oak Bay - Uplands Park
The District of Oak Bay - Oak Bay Cenotaph
Photo gallery uploaded on FLIKR

References

Parks in British Columbia